Alxa League or Alashan League (Mongolian Cyrillic. Алшаа аймаг) is one of 12 prefecture level divisions and 3 extant leagues of Inner Mongolia. The league borders Mongolia to the north, Bayan Nur to the northeast, Wuhai and Ordos to the east, Ningxia to the southeast, and Gansu to the south and west. The capital is Bayanhot Town, formerly known as Dingyuanying or Wang Ye Fu, in the aimag's Left Banner. The Mongolian variety spoken in this area is the Alasha dialect.

Demographics 
In the 2010 census, there were 231,334 inhabitants. Alxa is the least populated region of Inner Mongolia Autonomous Region.

A number of residents have been relocated from the growing Tengger Desert.

Economy
Since 2010, Alxa League has frequently appeared as one of the most prosperous prefecture-level divisions in all of China when measured by GDP per capita; in 2013, the GDP per head was approximately $30,000 USD. If using this measure alone, Alxa was ranked first in China, even higher than its neighbor Ordos. Wealth in the region is not evenly distributed, and the numbers are skewed by its low permanent population. Much of the productive economic activity takes place under the auspices of several large companies operating in the region, extracting natural resources. These include China Kingho Corporation, a "clean coal" technology operator, and the Inner Mongolia based Taiximei Group. Due to its remote location, much of the economic activity takes place with the support of migrant laborers from other parts of China. The high per capita GDP is not reflected in the salaries of the average low-skilled worker, which is on par with other mid-sized Chinese cities.

Administrative subdivisions 

Alxa is divided into three banners:

See also 
 Jiuquan Satellite Launch Center

References

External links 

 

 
Prefecture-level divisions of Inner Mongolia
Articles containing Mongolian script text